Carmen Leonor Rodríguez Bolaños (born 15 July 1949) is a Bolivian economist, politician, and trade unionist who served as a party-list member of the Chamber of Deputies from La Paz from 2010 to 2015.

Raised in the mines of Quechisla, Rodríguez studied economics at the Higher University of San Andrés, during which time she involved herself in student activism. After leaving university, she dedicated herself to a long career in the private sector, only gaining prominence in trade unionism after entering retirement. She held roles within the National Confederation of Retirees and served as executive of Light, Strength, Telephones National Federation of Retirees from 2008 to 2010.

In 2009, Rodríguez was nominated for a seat in the Chamber of Deputies, a product of the solid alliance between the Movement for Socialism and the country's leading retirees unions. Elected to represent La Paz, she primarily performed her parliamentary duties from the lower chamber's Social Policy Commission until the conclusion of her term in 2015. She was not nominated for reelection.

Early life and career

Early life and education 
Carmen Rodríguez was born on 15 July 1949 to Carlos Rodríguez and Elena Bolaños. Her mother, likewise, also worked in the mines as a rural school professor. Rodríguez received only a primary education, completing up to fifth grade as part of the first class of students to attend Quechisla's newly founded schoolhouse.

In 1965, Rodríguez left her family and moved back to La Paz to pursue higher education. She studied economics at the Higher University of San Andrés, during which time she became active in the student movement, first as a member of various student centers before later acceding the Local University Federation, where she performed secretarial tasks. Her involvement in student activism came during a period of political radicalism for the movement, oriented toward left-wing politics and social struggle. At a time of dictatorial rule in the country, such activism was often met with reprisals, and Rodríguez even endured arrest at one point.

Career and trade unionism 
Shortly after leaving university, Rodríguez returned to the mines, where she briefly worked as a mathematics professor.

Rodríguez's entry into union activity did not occur until after she retired, an atypical circumstance, given the relative youth of most individuals who initiate trade union careers. She first joined the COTEL Retirees Federation before later becoming a member of the National Confederation of Retirees, where she focused her efforts on activities relating to social control, overseeing the work of state-run hospitals to ensure they met basic standards for her sector. By 2008, Rodríguez had risen to the position of executive of the Light, Strength, Telephones National Federation of Retirees, a position she held until early 2010.

Chamber of Deputies

Election 
Since the 2005 elections, the union sector representing retirees and pensioners had aligned itself with the ruling Movement for Socialism (MAS-IPSP), a pact that procured positions for affiliated members on the party's parliamentary lists. In 2009, the National Confederation of Retirees' political arm selected Rodríguez as their candidate for that year's general election, through which she acceded to a seat in the Chamber of Deputies in representation of La Paz.

Tenure 
In parliament, Rodríguez's work focused on legislating from the lower chamber's Social Policy Commission. She held seats on the commission's committees for four of the five years she was in office, serving on the Social Welfare Committee for one term and on the Labor Committee for three, including chairing said body from 2012 to 2013. Her tenure saw Bolivia become the country with one of the highest pension coverages in the region, with around ninety-seven percent of the retired population benefitting from a social safety net, far above its more developed neighbors. Aged 66 by the time her term expired, Rodríguez was not nominated for reelection.

Commission assignments 
 Plural Justice, Prosecutor's Office, and Legal Defense of the State Commission
 Ordinary Jurisdiction and Magistracy Council Committee (2013–2014)
 Social Policy Commission
 Labor and Employment Law Committee (2010–2012; Secretary: 2012–2013)
 Social Welfare and Protection Committee (2014–2015)

Electoral history

References

Notes

Footnotes

Bibliography

External links 
 Deputies profile Vice Presidency .
 Biographic profile ERBOL .

1949 births
Living people
21st-century Bolivian politicians
21st-century Bolivian women politicians
Bolivian economists
Bolivian student activists
Bolivian trade union leaders
Bolivian women economists
Bolivian women trade unionists
Higher University of San Andrés alumni
Mathematics educators
Members of the Bolivian Chamber of Deputies from La Paz
Movement for Socialism (Bolivia) politicians
People from La Paz
Women members of the Chamber of Deputies (Bolivia)